Withrow Springs State Park is a  public recreation area with campgrounds and hiking trails located  north of Huntsville, Arkansas, that serves as a put-in for float trips on War Eagle Creek.

References

External links
Withrow Springs State Park Arkansas State Parks 

State parks of Arkansas
Protected areas of Madison County, Arkansas
Protected areas established in 1965
1965 establishments in Ohio